Steven or Stephen Black may refer to:

Steven Black (businessman) (born 1953), American investment banker
Steven Black (footballer) (born 1992), Scottish footballer
Steven Black (gridiron football) (born 1986), American footballer
Stephen Black (playwright) (1880–1931), South African playwright
Don Black (white supremacist) (Stephen Donald Black, born 1953), American white nationalist
Stephen Black (born 1980), Australian basketball player
Steve Black (1927–2008), Canadian ice hockey player
Steve Black (politician) (born 1982), Canadian politician
Sweet Baboo (Stephen Black), Welsh musician